The Battle of Savra ("Battle on the Saurian field") or the Battle of the Vjosë was fought on 18 September 1385 between Ottoman and much smaller Zetan forces, at the Savra field near Lushnjë (in modern-day southern Albania). The Ottomans were invited by Karl Thopia to support him in his feud against Balša II.

Background 
In 1372, Balša II married Komnina, the daughter of John Komnenos Asen, the Despot of Valona. As a dowry, Balša gained the cities of Valona (modern Vlorë), Berat, and Kanina (in modern-day southern Albania), located in Asen's province. In 1385 Balša II conquered Durazzo (modern Durrës), presumably from Karl Topia. In a charter to Ragusa issued in April 1385, he called himself "Duke of Durazzo". The expansion of Balšić's realm into Epirus brought him to the frontline against the Ottomans. Being aware of Ottoman aspirations to his territory, on 8 August 1385 Balša II asked Venetians to support him with four galleys.

Battle 
Karlo Thopia invited the Ottomans to support him in conflict with Balša II. Thopia's invitation was accepted and Hayreddin Pasha brought his forces from the region of Ohrid (modern-day Macedonia) to Saurian field, near Lushnjë. News about the incursion of the Ottoman forces into the region of Berat reached Balša II while he was in Durrës. According to Mavro Orbini, Balša II rounded up one thousand men in Durrës and, ignoring the advice of his nobles, headed out to take on the Ottoman raiders. Unsurprisingly, Balša's small forces had little success and Balša II was killed. Orbini's work is the only source that mention Ivaniš Mrnjavčević as participating in this battle. Some scholars believe he did not even exist, while others believe that he was not an independent medieval lord, but a loyal member of the Balšić family. Another person mentioned only by Orbini is Balša's voivode Đurađ Krvavčić, described as a brave warrior who also died in this battle. Mavrini explains that the body of Balša II was decapitated and his head taken to Hayreddin Pasha.

Aftermath 
Since the Ottomans were victorious, most of the local Serbian and Albanian lords became vassals. Immediately after this battle Thopia recaptured Durrës, probably under the Ottoman suzerainty. The Ottomans captured Krujë, Berat, and Ulcinj and soon retreated from them keeping only Kastoria under their permanent control.

The work of Mavro Orbini (The Realm of the Slavs) is one of the main primary sources about this battle. It contains many incorrect and imprecise data. Another primary source about the Battle of Savra is Marin Barleti who explained that Balša II was brave and idealistic.

This battle set the foundation for centuries-long Ottoman presence in this part of the Balkans. Serbian historian Stojan Novaković emphasized that the battle's importance for these Serbian and Albanian lords was comparable to that of the Battle of Marica and Battle of Kosovo together. The important result of this battle was the influx of Albanians into Ottoman forces who had been a significant source of its strength during the next 527 years.

References

Sources 
 
 
 
 
 

1385 in Europe
Battles involving the Ottoman Empire
Battles involving Serbia in the Middle Ages
History of the Serbs
14th century in Serbia
Conflicts in 1385
Medieval Albania
1385 in the Ottoman Empire
Ottoman Albania
Battles involving Albania